Dimorphoceratinae is one of two subfamilies included in the family Dimorphoceratidae.  The subfamily is characterized by having only the ventral lobe of the suture subdivided. Shells are completely involute, with the inner whorls completely hidden, and mostly suboxiconic such that the rim, or venter, is fairly narrow. Sculpture consists only of growth lines, sometimes with delicate spiral ornamentation. The Ventral lobe becomes extremely wide by subdivision.

References

 GONIAT Online - Dimorphoceratinae 5/30/12
 The Paleobiology Database 10/01/07

Dimorphoceratidae